In basketball, points are accumulated through free throws or field goals. The National Basketball League's (NBL) scoring title is awarded to the player with the highest points per game average in a given season. The scoring title was originally determined by total points scored through the 1996 season, after which points per game was used to determine the leader instead. Players who earned scoring titles before the 1984 season did not record any three-point field goals because the three-point line had just been implemented in the NBL at the start of that season.

Andrew Gaze has won the most scoring titles, with 14. He also holds the all-time records for total points scored (1,007; 1991) and points per game (44.1; 1987) in a season. Between 1986 and 2001, Gaze was the leader in either total points or points per game every season. While he led the NBL in points per game in 1987 (44.1) and 1990 (37.6), he was not the leader in total points scored. His 882 total points in 1987 were third best behind Paul Stanley (920) and James Crawford (903), while his 828 points in 1990 were also third best behind Derek Rucker (865) and Wayne McDaniel (848).

Key

Scoring leaders

Multiple-time leaders

Notes

References

National Basketball League (Australia) awards
Scoring